"Sound of Silence" is a song performed by Australian recording artist Dami Im. Written by Anthony Egizii and David Musumeci of DNA Songs, it is best known as Australia's entry at the Eurovision Song Contest 2016 which was held in Stockholm, Sweden, where it finished 2nd, receiving a total of 511 points. The song also won the Marcel Bezençon Award in the composer category. The song was leaked on 10 March 2016, one day before its initial release date. It is Dami Im's fourth Australian top 20 hit and worldwide, it reached the top 40 in more than six countries after the Eurovision Song Contest 2016 Final.

Track listing

Other versions (Sony promo release)
 Glamstarr Club Mix – 6:26
 Glamstarr Radio Edit – 3:49
 Glamstarr Instrumental – 6:26

Charts

Certifications

References

Eurovision songs of Australia
Eurovision songs of 2016
2016 songs
2016 singles
Dami Im songs
Sony Music Australia singles
Songs written by Anthony Egizii
Songs written by David Musumeci
Song recordings produced by DNA Songs